Billy Hobby's Well is in Grosvenor Park, Chester, Cheshire, England.  Its canopy is recorded in the National Heritage List for England as a designated Grade II listed building.

History

Grosvenor Park was developed on land given to the city of Chester by Richard Grosvenor, 2nd Marquess of Westminster in the 1860s.  The land consisted of fields on the north side of the River Dee overlooking the river.  The largest of these fields was known as Billy Obbies' Field.  This field contained a spring or well that was believed to have magical powers; maidens stood with their right leg in the water and wished for husbands.  As part of the development of the park, the Marquess commissioned the Chester architect John Douglas to design a number of features for the park, including a canopy for the well.  The structure is now used as a pump house for the water garden in the park.

Architecture

The canopy is built in red and buff sandstone ashlar.  It stands on a square plinth and has canted corners.  Each face has a pointed arch flanked by a granite column containing wrought iron bars.  The voussoirs of the arches include carved roses.  On each corner is a small carved circle containing carved sheafs and portcullises.  The roof consists of a tiled spire, and at its apex is a lead finial surmounted by a copper fish which acts as a weather vane.

See also

Grade II listed buildings in Chester (east)
List of non-ecclesiastical and non-residential works by John Douglas

References

Buildings and structures in Chester
Grade II listed buildings in Chester
Buildings and structures completed in 1867
John Douglas buildings
Water wells in England